The fishing vessel Gaul was a deep sea factory ship based at Hull, United Kingdom. She was launched in December 1971 by Brooke Marine of Lowestoft, entering service during 1972 with the Ranger Fishing company, where she was registered at North Shields as Ranger Castor, SN18. She was renamed when Ranger Fishing was bought by British United Trawlers and re-registered at Hull as Gaul, H243. She sank some time on the night of 8-9 February 1974 in storm conditions in the Barents Sea, north of Norway. No distress signal was received and her loss was not realised until 10 February after she twice failed to report in. An extensive search operation was launched but no trace of the ship was found, apart from a lifebuoy recovered three months later. All thirty-six crew were lost. The president of the British Trawler Federation described the loss of the Gaul as "the worst ever single-trawler tragedy".

Final voyage 
Gaul sailed from Hull on the morning of 22 January 1974. Mate George Petty became ill and was put ashore at Lødingen on the 26th. Maurice Spurgeon joined the crew on the 28th at Tromsø and Gaul arrived at the fishing grounds off the north coast of Norway the following day.
On 8 February the sea state became severe. Reports from the skippers of other trawlers in the area give the wave height at between 6.5 and 9m, wind between 7 and 10 on the Beaufort scale.

At 09:30 Gaul reported to British United Trawlers that she was "laid and dodging off the North Cape Bank".  At 10:30, as was company policy,  she reported  to the Orsino on the "Skipper's Freezer Schedule" - a summary of position, weather conditions, catch etcetera. A further report was due at 16:30 but Gaul, alone of the 17 British United Trawlers ships in the area at the time, failed to report.

By the afternoon of 10 February British United Trawlers had alerted their insurance company, UK Trawlers Mutual that Gaul had failed to report for two days. On the following morning the insurance company sent out a message to all the trawlers they insured reading 

The aircraft carrier HMS Hermes was in the area and was ordered to commence searching. The search involved four other British ships, three Norwegian ships and 19 trawlers, coordinated by the Hermes. No evidence of the missing Gaul was found and the search was called off on the afternoon of 15 February.

The 1970s Formal Investigation 
The original Formal Investigation in 1974 concluded that the most likely reason for her loss was that she was overwhelmed by a succession of very large waves in heavy seas and capsized. The preliminary investigation had also found deficiencies in the maintenance of chutes, doors and hatches on Gauls sister ship Kurd, but the relevance of this fact was downplayed at the formal inquiry.

Gaul was one of the most modern ships in the UK fishing fleet — she was only 18 months old — and relatives of the crew were reluctant to accept the investigation findings.

In 1975 a TV programme claimed she had been sunk while engaging in espionage and over the years other theories, including conspiracy theories, have been advanced:

 She was captured and interned by the Soviet Union because she was engaged in espionage.
 She was sunk by a Soviet submarine for the same reason.
 She collided with a submarine engaged in clandestine operations.
 She was dragged under after snagging her trawling gear in secret undersea cables (SOSUS).

The wreck is found 

In 1975 the Norwegian trawler Rairo reported snagging her nets on an undersea obstruction in the area where the Gaul was lost. In 1977, however, the UK government decided against launching a search based on this (and other similar) information, despite being confident that this was indeed Gaul. It was argued that such an investigation would add little new information in aid of safety at sea to justify the cost.

In 1997 a TV crew, with help from Norwegian experts located the wreck exactly where Rairo had reported the snagging of her nets.

This prompted UK Deputy Prime Minister (and Hull MP) John Prescott to ask the Marine Accident Investigation Branch of the Department for Transport to carry out extensive surveys of the wreck, which it did in 1998 and 2002. During the latter part of the underwater survey in 2002, samples of bones and other human remains were recovered from the wreck, DNA tests conducted by the Forensic Science Service established that the remains came from four of the Gaul's crew. This finding quelled suspicions that the crew had been taken from the vessel by the Russians during cold war hostilities. 
After reviewing the factual evidence gained from the underwater  surveys, the MAIB concluded that there was enough new evidence to warrant a new formal inquiry. The surveys revealed that some of Gauls hatches and doors were open and, specifically, the outer non-return flaps and the inner covers to the duff and offal waste chutes were open. Additionally, the inner cover to the duff chute appeared to be secured open and the ship's steering gear (kort nozzle) was found to be full over to port. John Prescott concurred with the MAIB and a new investigation was launched (the 2004 Re-opened Formal Investigation (RFI)).

2004 inquiry 
On 17 December 2004 the RFI concluded that these open chutes, doors and hatches had compromised the ship's watertight integrity and, combined with a following (and as already noted) heavy sea led to flooding on the factory deck. The RFI also postulated that an attempted emergency manoeuvre by the Gauls officer of the watch (a perfectly logical move to try to turn 'into the sea') caused 100 tonnes of floodwater to surge across to the starboard side of the ship leading to capsize and a catastrophic loss of stability. Further flooding then took place through open doors, chutes and hatches until the Gaul lost her reserves of buoyancy, she then sank very rapidly, stern first.

The report of the RFI dismissed the notion that Gaul was involved in espionage or that she was in a collision. It found that she was not fishing at the time of her loss, which indicated that no snagging (of the nets) could have occurred.

In the immediate wake of the report, relatives of the crew said they were not satisfied and claimed that the "truth was still to be told".

Memorial service 
In February 2014, a memorial service was held on St. Andrew's Quay, Hull, to mark the 40th anniversary of the loss of the Gaul.

References

Notes 

 Gaul was one of four ships in her class. the others were Kurd, Kelt and Arab (later Kappin).
 She was a stern trawler, meaning that the nets were cast off of the back of the ship (rather than the side, as with a sidewinder trawler) 
 She was a filleter-freezer factory ship and processed fish, as well as catching it. This means she effectively had two crews, the 'sailing' crew and the factory crew. The Reopened Formal Investigation noted this as a potential risk factor if the factory crew were not fully conversant with the safe operation of Gaul.
 The report claimed that the skipper and Mate, although experienced mariners, had never sailed in a ship of Gaul'''s class, specifically ships with separate factory crew.
 The chutes at the centre of the RFI's conclusions were the duff and offal chutes, used to dispose of unwanted marine organisms and fish processing waste respectively. The Wreck Commissioner, Mr Justice Steel, said of the poor condition of these chutes: "This reflects poorly on the maintenance and repair work performed by the owners and their staff."
The inquiry secured for the first time official confirmation that the UK government used trawlers for espionage during the Cold War, but found no evidence that Gaul was - or had ever been - so used.
In 2010 an independent and critical investigation was carried out into the Gaul'''s reserves of operational stability, the results of which revealed that she did not meet the IMCO (now IMO) minimum stability standards in all of her anticipated seagoing conditions.

Bibliography

External links 
Site claiming conspiracy of silence over an alleged design fault

Fishing vessels of the United Kingdom
Shipwrecks in the Barents Sea
Cold War history of the United Kingdom
Conspiracy theories
Maritime incidents in 1974
1974 in the United Kingdom